Vesical tenesmus refers to the feeling of incomplete emptying of the bladder following urination. When the word tenesmus is used without modification, it usually refers to rectal tenesmus. Vesical tenesmus is caused by urogenital diaphragm muscle spasms.

See also
 Post-void dribbling
 Prostate
 Rectal tenesmus

References

External links 

Symptoms and signs: Urinary system